The EFAF Euro Top 20 is the official EFAF ranking system for American Football club teams in Europe.

The list considers only those teams playing in an EFAF member country, and competing in one of the official EFAF international competitions (European Football League, EFAF Cup, EFAF Challenge Cup or EFAF Atlantic Cup).

The list is updated after every weekend of European competition, or at least every two weeks, during the EFAF competition period of April to July.

EFAF Euro Top 20

2017
Last ranking from May 25, 2017. In 2019 EFAF became part of IFAF Europe
  Braunschweig Lions
  Frankfurt Universe
  Berlin Rebels
  Amsterdam Crusaders
  Milano Seamen
  Badalona Dracs
  Thonon Black Panthers
  Rhinos Milano
  Dauphins de Nice
  Prague Black Panthers
  Berlin Adler
  Schwäbisch Hall Unicorns
  Dresden Monarchs
  Swarco Raiders Tirol
  Vienna Vikings
  Carlstad Crusaders
  Basel Gladiators
  Copenhagen Towers
  Moscow Patriots
  Panthers Wrocław

2013
Accurate as of June 20th 2013.

References

External links
Official EFAF Competition website

American football in Europe